Arbili v Arbili [2015] EWCA Civ 542 is a court of appeal case on whether a financial order could set aside with information obtained by means of hacking.

Facts
The Applicant, D Arbili represented by Dominic Levent Solicitors, and the Respondent, his ex-wife C Arbili, represented by Howard Kennedy at the time of the hearing; had been married for 7 years before divorcing and engaging in financial proceedings to split the family's assets. At the initial hearing an order was made for the assets to split whereby the Respondent, Mrs Arbili, received the equity from the family home (a £1m grade-II listed barn in Essex), one of two French villas held in the Applicants name and a £140,000 lump sum, taking the total received to over £600,000 – allowing her to purchase a new home. However, the Applicant thereafter instructed agents to delve into the Respondent's finances and found that Mrs Arbili was in line to receive a share of her parents £2.1m property on the French Riviera. The information was obtained by hacking into the Respondents emails and the Applicant sought to rely on this information to set aside the financial order as the Respondent had not complied by providing full disclosure whilst financial proceedings were ongoing. The Respondent argued that given the Respondents interest in her parents' property, he would not have included his French villa in considering the original financial proceedings. The Applicant's application to set aside was refused and he thereafter appealed.

Judgment
The Judge dismissed the Applicant's appeal to set aside. The Judge cited that the manner in which the information was obtained, by hacking into the Respondents emails, and the Applicant's continued failure to describe the means by which the information was obtained meant that the information could not be relied upon.

See also
Divorce in England and Wales

References

Divorce law in the United Kingdom
English tort case law
House of Lords cases
2015 in case law
2015 in British law